This is a list of career achievements by Fabian Cancellara, a Swiss former professional racing cyclist. During his professional career, Cancellara was known for being a quality time trialist, a classics specialist, and a workhorse for his teammates that had general classification aspirations. Cancellara achieved great successes in the classics; he won Paris–Roubaix three times, Milan–San Remo once, and the Tour of Flanders three times. Cancellara won the opening stage of the Tour de France five times and led the race for 29 days total, the most of any rider to not win the Tour. His success was not limited to just time trials and classics, as he has won the general classification of the Tirreno–Adriatico, Tour de Suisse, and the Tour of Oman. In 2008, he won gold in the individual time trial and silver in the men's road race at the Summer Olympics. In 2016, he won Olympic gold in the individual time trial for the second time in his career. In addition, Cancellara was time trial world champion four times in his career.

Career highlights
2006
 Cancellara wins Paris–Roubaix, the first Swiss rider to do so since Heiri Suter in 1923.
2007
 After two previous prologue stage wins in 2004 and earlier in the 2007 edition, Cancellara wins his first road stage at the Tour de France, out-sprinting the main sprinters in the peloton into Compiègne.
2008
 Cancellara wins his second Monument classic at Milan–San Remo, breaking away from the leading group in the final kilometres.
 Cancellara wins the gold medal in the road time trial event of the Olympics in Beijing, finishing over half a minute of his closest rival.
2009
 Cancellara wins two of the three individual time trial stages at the Vuelta a España, holding the race leader's gold jersey for five days.
 Cancellara wins a record-equalling third world time trial championships on home soil in Mendrisio. Winning the gold medal by almost a minute and a half, Cancellara free-wheeled the final 200 metres saluting the crowd.
2010
 Cancellara drops Tom Boonen on the Muur van Geraardsbergen, en route to victory at the Tour of Flanders. By winning the Tour of Flanders, Cancellara became the twelfth cyclist to win the opening three Monuments of the cycling year – Milan–San Remo, Tour of Flanders, and the Paris–Roubaix – in a career.
 Matching his compatriot Heiri Suter's feat from 1923, Cancellara follows up his Tour of Flanders victory with success at Paris–Roubaix.
 Cancellara sets a new record for world time trial titles, with his fourth coming in Geelong, Australia.
2012
 During the Tour de France, Cancellara sets a new record for most days spent in the maillot jaune of the general classification leader for a rider not to have won the Tour de France general classification, surpassing René Vietto's tally of 26 days.
2013
 As he did in 2010, Cancellara wins both the Tour of Flanders and Paris–Roubaix.
2014
 Cancellara wins a four-rider sprint to win his second consecutive Tour of Flanders. His third victory in the race, and a seventh Monument overall, also made him the sixth rider to achieve the feat.
2016
 Cancellara wins Strade Bianche, a race that includes sectors of gravel roads similar to the cobbles of Paris–Roubaix, for the third time. As a result of his success, a sector of the gravel roads was named in his honour.
 Cancellara takes his tenth victory at the Swiss National Time Trial Championships in Martigny.
 Cancellara wins the gold medal in the road time trial event of the Olympics in Rio de Janeiro, finishing 47 seconds of his closest rival. This was his 75th and final professional win.

Major results
Road

1997
 2nd Road race, European Youth Summer Olympic Days
 2nd Road race, National Novice Road Championships
1998
 1st  Time trial, UCI Junior Road World Championships
1999
 1st  Time trial, UCI Junior Road World Championships
 1st  Road race, National Junior Road Championships
 1st  Overall Course de la Paix Juniors
2000
 1st  Time trial, National Under-23 Road Championships
 1st Gran Premio Palio del Recioto
 2nd  Time trial, UCI Under-23 Road World Championships
 4th Time trial, UEC European Under-23 Road Championships
 10th Overall Circuit Franco-Belge
2001
 1st  Overall Tour of Rhodes
1st Prologue
 2nd Time trial, National Road Championships
 2nd Grand Prix Eddy Merckx (with Michael Rogers)
 2nd Duo Normand (with Michael Rogers)
 5th Berner Rundfahrt
2002
 1st  Time trial, National Road Championships
 1st  Overall GP Erik Breukink
1st Young rider classification
1st Stage 3b (ITT)
 1st  Overall Tour of Rhodes
1st Prologue
 1st Grand Prix Eddy Merckx (with László Bodrogi)
 1st ZLM Tour
 1st Stage 1a (ITT) Tour of Austria
 1st Stage 3 (ITT) Ytong Bohemia Tour
 2nd Chrono des Herbiers
 6th Overall Circuit des Mines
 7th Berner Rundfahrt
 8th Stausee-Rundfahrt Klingnau
 8th Grand Prix des Nations
 9th Time trial, UCI Road World Championships
 9th CSC Classic
2003
 Tour de Romandie
1st  Points classification
1st Prologue
 1st Prologue Tour de Suisse
 1st Stage 4 (ITT) Tour of Belgium
 1st Stage 6 (TTT) Tour Méditerranéen
 4th Overall Ronde van Nederland
1st  Young rider classification
 8th Overall Three Days of De Panne
1st Young rider classification
 9th Overall Deutschland Tour
 9th Grand Prix des Nations
2004
 1st  Time trial, National Road Championships
 Tour de France
1st Prologue
Held  after Prologue
 1st Stage 1 Setmana Catalana de Ciclisme
 1st Stage 4 (ITT) Tour de Luxembourg
 1st Stage 4 Tour of Qatar
 4th Overall Three Days of De Panne
1st Young rider classification
 4th Paris–Roubaix
 4th Firenze–Pistoia
 8th Time trial, UCI Road World Championships
 9th Time trial, Olympic Games
2005
 1st  Time trial, National Road Championships
 1st Stage 4 Paris–Nice
 1st Stage 5 (ITT) Setmana Catalana de Ciclisme
 2nd Overall Tour de Luxembourg
1st Stage 3b (ITT)
 3rd  Time trial, UCI Road World Championships
 4th Gent–Wevelgem
 4th HEW Cyclassics
 7th Chrono des Herbiers
 8th Paris–Roubaix
2006
 1st  Time trial, UCI Road World Championships
 1st  Time trial, National Road Championships
 1st  Overall Danmark Rundt
1st Stages 2 & 5 (ITT)
 1st Paris–Roubaix
 1st Stage 1 (ITT) Volta a Catalunya
 1st Stage 5 (ITT) Tirreno–Adriatico
 1st Stage 1 (TTT) Vuelta a España
 2nd LuK Challenge Chrono (with Fränk Schleck)
 5th Züri-Metzgete
 6th Tour of Flanders
 6th Gent–Wevelgem
2007
 1st  Time trial, UCI Road World Championships
 National Road Championships
1st  Time trial
2nd Road race
 Tour de France
1st Prologue & Stage 3
Held  from Stages 1–6
 Tour de Suisse
1st Prologue & Stage 9 (ITT)
 1st Stage 2 (TTT) Deutschland Tour
 2nd E3 Prijs Vlaanderen
2008
 Olympic Games
1st  Time trial
2nd  Road race
 1st  Time trial, National Road Championships
 1st  Overall Tirreno–Adriatico
1st Stage 5 (ITT)
 1st Milan–San Remo
 1st Monte Paschi Eroica Strade Bianche
 Tour de Suisse
1st  Points classification
1st Stages 7 & 9
 1st Stage 20 (ITT) Tour de France
 1st Prologue Tour de Luxembourg
 1st Stage 1 (TTT) Tour de Pologne
 2nd Paris–Roubaix
 4th Overall Tour of California
1st Prologue
2009
 UCI Road World Championships
1st  Time trial
5th Road race
 1st  Road race, National Road Championships
 1st  Overall Tour de Suisse
1st  Points classification
1st Stages 1 (ITT) & 9 (ITT)
 Tour de France
1st Stage 1 (ITT)
Held  from Stages 1–6
 Vuelta a España
1st Stages 1 (ITT) & 7 (ITT)
Held  from Stages 1–4 & 7
 1st Prologue Tour of California
2010
 1st  Time trial, UCI Road World Championships
 1st  Overall Tour of Oman
 1st Paris–Roubaix
 1st Tour of Flanders
 1st E3 Prijs Vlaanderen
 Tour de France
1st Prologue & Stage 19 (ITT)
Held  for Stages 1, 3–6
 1st Stage 1 (ITT) Tour de Suisse
2011
 1st  Road race, National Road Championships
 1st E3 Prijs Vlaanderen
 Tour de Suisse
1st Stages 1 (ITT) & 9 (ITT)
 1st Prologue Tour de Luxembourg
 1st Stage 7 (ITT) Tirreno–Adriatico
 1st Stage 1 (TTT) Vuelta a España
 2nd Milan–San Remo
 2nd Paris–Roubaix
 UCI Road World Championships
3rd  Time trial
4th Road race
 3rd Tour of Flanders
 5th Montepaschi Strade Bianche
 6th Overall Tour of Oman
2012
 National Road Championships
1st  Time trial
3rd Road race
 1st Strade Bianche
 Tour de France
1st Prologue
Held  from Stages 1–6
 1st Stage 7 (ITT) Tirreno–Adriatico
 2nd Milan–San Remo
 7th Time trial, Olympic Games
 7th Overall Tour of Qatar
 10th Overall Tour of Oman
2013
 1st  Time trial, National Road Championships
 1st Tour of Flanders
 1st Paris–Roubaix
 1st E3 Harelbeke
 1st Stage 7 (ITT) Tour of Austria
 1st Stage 11 (ITT) Vuelta a España
 UCI Road World Championships
3rd  Time trial
10th Road race
 3rd Milan–San Remo
 4th Strade Bianche
 7th UCI World Tour
2014
 1st  Time trial, National Road Championships
 1st Tour of Flanders
 2nd Milan–San Remo
 3rd Paris–Roubaix
 5th Overall Dubai Tour
 6th Strade Bianche
 9th E3 Harelbeke
2015
 1st Stage 2 Tour of Oman
 1st Stage 7 (ITT) Tirreno–Adriatico
 7th Trofeo Playa de Palma
 7th Milan–San Remo
 Tour de France
Held  after Stage 2
2016
 1st  Time trial, Olympic Games
 1st  Time trial, National Road Championships
 1st Strade Bianche
 1st Trofeo Serra de Tramuntana
 1st Stage 3 (ITT) Volta ao Algarve
 1st Stage 7 (ITT) Tirreno–Adriatico
 1st Stage 1 (ITT) Tour de Suisse
 2nd Tour of Flanders
 4th E3 Harelbeke
 4th Gent–Wevelgem
 6th Trofeo Pollença
 7th Overall Dubai Tour

Critériums

2006
 1st Schellenberg Rundfahrt
2007
 1st Wiesbauer Rathauskriterium
 1st Gala Tour de France
 3rd Profronde Stiphout
2009
 1st Profronde van Wateringen
2010
 1st Criterium Aalst
 3rd Natourcriterium Roeselare
2011
 2nd Sykkelfestival Kristiansand
2014
 2nd GP Stad Kortrijk
2016
 1st GP Stad Kortrijk
 1st Internationaal Criterium van Bavikhove

General classification results timeline

Classics results timeline

Major championships timeline

Awards
 Vélo d'Or: 2010

References

External links
 
 
 

Cancellara